Baumgarten may refer to:

Places
Baumgarten, Burgenland, Austria
Baumgarten, Vienna, Austria
Baumgarten an der March, Austria (the natural gas hub)
Baumgarten, Germany, a municipality in Mecklenburg-Vorpommern, Germany

Other uses
Baumgarten (surname)
Baumgarten Prize, a former literary award in Hungary